Second Republic can refer to:

Governments

Africa
 Second Republic of Ghana (1969–1972)
 Second Republic of Uganda (1971–1979)
 Second Republic of Madagascar, also known as the "Democratic Republic of Madagascar" (1975–1993)
 Second Nigerian Republic (1979–1983)
 Second Republic in the Constitution of Niger (1989–1992)
 Second Republic of Sierra Leone (1996–1997)

Americas
 Second Republic of Venezuela (1813–1814)
 Second Mexican Republic (1846–1863)
 Second Dominican Republic (1865–1916)
 Second Brazilian Republic (1930–1937)
 Second Costa Rican Republic, since 1948

Asia
 Second Republic of China (1928–1948)
 Second Philippine Republic (1943–1945)
 Second East Turkestan Republic (1944–1949)
 Second Syrian Republic (1950–1958, 1961–1963)
 Second Republic of Korea (1960–1961)
 Second Republic of Vietnam (1963–1975)
 Second Republic of the Maldives, since 1968
 Second Cambodian Republic (1975–1979)

Europe
 Second Roman Republic, also known as the "Commune of Rome" (1144–1193)
 French Second Republic (1848–1852)
 Second Polish Republic (1918–1949)
 Second Armenian Republic, or Armenian Soviet Socialist Republic (1920–1991)
 Second Hellenic Republic (1924–1935)
 Second Spanish Republic (1931–1939)
 Portuguese Second Republic, also known as the "Estado Novo" (1933–1974)
 Second Czechoslovak Republic (1938–1939)
 Second Austrian Republic, the current state, from 1945 onwards
 Second Hungarian Republic (1946–1949)
 Second Slovak Republic, the current state, from 1993 onwards
 Second Italian Republic, since 1994
 Second Republic of Kosovo, since 2008

Other uses
 Second Republic (campaign group), a campaign group for political reform in Ireland

See also

 First Republic
 Third Republic
 Fourth Republic
 Fifth Republic
 Sixth Republic
 Seventh Republic